The Empire of Glass is a Virgin Missing Adventures original novel written by Andy Lane based on the long-running British science fiction television series Doctor Who. It features the First Doctor, Steven Taylor, Vicki and Irving Braxiatel.

Plot
The Doctor, Steven, and Vicki land in what seems to be Venice in 1609, where they meet a host of major historical figures including Galileo Galilei and William Shakespeare. However, with the arrival of old acquaintance Irving Braxiatel, Vicki's abduction and the framing of Steven for murder, the Doctor soon finds himself embroiled in the sinister machinations of an alien invasion.

Source materials
In the acknowledgements, Lane notes that this was his own version of Tim Powers' The Stress of Her Regard.

References

External links
The Empire of Glass e-book at Feedbooks
The Cloister Library - The Empire of Glass

Fiction set in 1609
1995 British novels
1995 science fiction novels
First Doctor novels
Novels set in Venice
Virgin Missing Adventures
Novels by Andy Lane